The Darkest of Discos is the fifth studio album by Slowcoaster.

Track list
 "Darkest of Discos"
 "Fragilest Thing"
 "B.Y.O. Life"
 "Is This Stuff Working"
 "Light Years"
 "In Front of the Speaker"
 "Town on the Edge"
 "Mexican Guitar"
 "War on War"
 "Vapor"
 "Porno"
 "Fuck Last Night"
 "Burning Alive"

Awards

References

External links

2010 albums
Slowcoaster albums